Joe Nicholls may refer to:
 Joe Nicholls (footballer, born 1905) (1905–1973), English footballer for Darlaston, Northfleet United, Tottenham Hotspur and Bristol Rovers
 Joe Nicholls (footballer, fl. 1914–1925), English footballer for Clapton Orient
 Joseph Nicholls (cricketer), New Zealand cricketer

See also
 Joe Nichols, American country music artist
 Joe Nichols (journalist), American sports journalist